Liberalism in South Africa has encompassed various traditions and parties.

The moderate South African Party and its successor, the United Party, formed government several times between the formation of the Union and the election of the National Party in 1948. In 1959, members of the United Party formed the Progressive Party, a precursor to the present-day Democratic Alliance. Separately, in 1953, the anti-Apartheid and multi-racial Liberal Party of South Africa was formed, before disbanding in 1968.

Various South Africans have contributed prominently to liberalism in the country.

History

Timeline

Progressive Party to Unionist Party 
1890: The Progressive Party was formed.
1910: PP merged with the Constitutional Party from the Orange River Colony and the Progressives from the South African Republic to form the Unionist Party.
1920: The Unionist Party merged into the ⇒ South African Party.

South African Party 

 1911: The South African Party was formed of various pre-Union parties. Led by the moderate Louis Botha, it formed the first government of a united South Africa. The party's support base included English-speaking white South Africans who developed a pattern of supporting the most moderate Afrikaner politicians to avoid domination. The party's own 'liberal' wing was led by Jan Hofmeyr.
 1934: SAP merged into the ⇒ United Party.

United Party 

 1934: The United Party was formed in response to the Great Depression, combining Jan Smuts' South African Party and most of Barry Hertzog's National Party.
 1939: Hertzog left the party and a split formed following South Africa's entry into the Second World War. The party increasingly resembled the former South African Party.
 1948: The United Party, led by Jan Smuts, lost in the 1948 election to the Reunited National Party. The United Party based its platform on the recommendations of the Fagan Commission, which determined total segregation to be impossible, and advocated a relaxation of restrictions on black African migration into urban areas. The Reunited National Party, conversely, had campaigned on total racial separation.
 1973: Democratic Party broke away from the National Party.
 1977: DP and UP formed the New Republic Party.
 1987: NRP dissolved, many of their members went to the Independent Party.
 1988: IP and NRP merged into the ⇒ Democratic Party.

Liberal Party of South Africa 
1953: The Liberal Party of South Africa was formed by Alan Paton
1968: The SALP decided to disband rather than obey legislation outlawing multiracial political parties. The decision was also influenced by the fact that the leadership of the SALP had been decimated by banning orders and other restrictive measures, and by the fact that many stalwarts had been forced into exile.

Progressive Party to Democratic Alliance 
1959: Liberal members of the United Party seceded and formed the liberal Progressive Party. The parliamentary party is led by Helen Suzman
1975: The party merged with the Reform Party led by Harry Schwarz, a faction of the United Party, and became the Progressive Reform Party
1977: After the dissolution of the United Party, former members merged into the PRP, which is renamed the Progressive Federal Party
1987: National Party MP Wynand Malan quit the governing party to protest PW Botha's policies. South African Ambassador to the UK Denis Worrall quit his post in order to return to South Africa and fight apartheid. The two formed and led the liberal Independent Party.
1988: The PFP merged with the newly founded National Democratic Movement and the Independent Party into the Democratic Party
2000: The DP merged with the conservative New National Party into an alliance, the Democratic Alliance.
2001: The NNP left the alliance and the DP continues as the present-day Democratic Alliance

Mahlabatini Declaration 

On 4 January 1974, Transvaal United Party leader Harry Schwarz met with Mangosuthu Buthelezi and signed a five-point plan for racial peace in South Africa, which came to be known as the Mahlabatini Declaration of Faith. Its purpose was to provide a blueprint for the government of South Africa by consent and racial peace in a multi-racial society, stressing opportunity for all, consultation, the federal concept, and a bill of rights. It also affirmed that political change must take place though non-violent means, at a time when neither the National Party nor the African National Congress were looking to peaceful solutions or dialogue. The declaration enshrined the principles of peaceful transition of power and equality for all, the first of such agreements by acknowledged black and white political leaders in South Africa and was heralded by many as a breakthrough in race relations in South Africa. Liberal figures and others such as Alan Paton praised the declaration. The declaration drew much media interest both inside and outside South Africa. Schwarz, leader of the liberal 'Young Turks' in the UP, would be expelled with other liberals from the party the following year.

Prominent individuals

Politics 
South African Party: Louis Botha, Jan Smuts, Jan Hofmeyr. Botha and Smuts were the first and second prime ministers of South Africa respectively
United Party: Harry Schwarz, Jan Smuts
Liberal Party of South Africa: Alan Paton
Progressive Party: Jan Steytler, Colin Eglin, Bernard Friedman, Helen Suzman
Reform Party: Harry Schwarz
Progressive Reform and Progressive Federal Party: Colin Eglin, Frederik van Zyl Slabbert, Harry Schwarz, Zach de Beer
Independent Party: Denis Worrall, Wynand Malan
Democratic Party: Denis Worrall, Harry Schwarz Wynand Malan, Zach de Beer, Tony Leon, Sipho Moganedi (first black Democratic Party Youth national president, 1995 to 1998)
Democratic Alliance: Tony Leon, Helen Zille

Academia 
Donald Barkly Molteno (1908–1972)
Edgar Brookes (1897–1979)

Media and literature 
Author Alan Paton (1903–1988)
Laurence Gandar (1915–1998), editor of the liberal daily the Rand Daily Mail in Johannesburg from 1957 to 1969
Barry Streek (1948–2006)

Religion 
South African Council of Churches (SACC): Beyers Naudé

Liberal organisations 

 Helen Suzman Foundation
 Centre for Development and Enterprise
 South African Institute of Race Relations
 Black Sash
 Free Market Foundation

References

See also
 History of South Africa
 Politics of South Africa
 List of political parties in South Africa

 
Political movements in South Africa